Kriya (formerly MarketFinance Limited and MarketInvoice Limited) is a British business finance lender, specialising in invoice finance, business loans and embedded finance. Kriya was the first company to allow businesses to borrow against individual outstanding invoices.

As of December 2022, Kriya has facilitated over £20 billion of B2B payments and advanced over £3 billion in credit to UK SMEs.

In 2018, the company became the first FinTech company to partner with a major high street bank in the UK, Barclays bank.

History 
Kriya, originally named MarketInvoice, was created in 2011 by Anil Stocker, Ilya Kondrashov, and Charles Delingpole in response to the low levels of lending to SMEs by traditional high street banks.

Anil Stocker has served as CEO and Cofounder since the company began and Ilya Kondrashov as Cofounder and Chairman of the Risk Committee. Giles Andrews OBE was appointed the first chairman of the company in 2017.

In 2011, Kriya raised £930,000 in seed funding. In 2013 they announced that the UK Government's development bank, the British Business Bank, would begin to fund businesses through their platform. By the end of 2015 the company had opened an office in Manchester and raised a £6m series A funding round with venture capital firm Northzone and Paul Forster (founder of Indeed.com).

In 2016, Kriya received an additional £7.2m in funding from Northzone and MCI Partners.

In 2018, Kriya announced that they had funded over £2 billion worth of trade on their platform.

In 2019, the company completed a series B round raising a further £26m in equity funding from Barclays bank, Santander Innoventures, Northzone and Viola Credit.

On 12 November 2019, MarketInvoice was renamed MarketFinance as it launched a new business loans product.

In September 2021, Kriya announced a £280m debt and equity fundraise and its accreditation under the Recovery Loan Scheme (RLS). This comes after being one of the first fintechs to be accredited under the Coronavirus Business Interruption Loan Scheme (CBILS), having lent £250m to companies across the UK.

On 19 May 2022 Kriya raised £100m in debt financing from Deutsche Bank.

On 30 November 2022, MarketFinance formally became Kriya. Since their inception in 2011 the market and consumers have evolved. As a result, Kriya moved beyond offering invoice finance by adding a digital loans product, including working with the British Business Bank to deliver Covid-loans to businesses when they needed it most. As of 2022, Kriya started offering embedded payments and credit options within B2B transactions.

Products 

In 2017 the company released a Confidential Invoice Discounting facility that would allow businesses to upload their entire invoice book to borrow against. In 2018 Kriya launched a business loan product followed by an embedded finance product in 2021.

Partners and investors 

A number of different investors fund business through Kriya's platform, ranging from institutional investors to regional funds and banks.

In August 2013, Kriya was awarded £5 million in government funding to lend to small businesses through the Business Finance Partnership. The extension of the scheme, to boost finance through non-bank lenders, was announced by Vince Cable, business secretary. This deal was extended in September 2015 for a further 3 years, taking their total investment in Kriya's platform to £10m.

In 2018 Portugal's bank Banco BNI Europa and the German Varengold Bank announced that they would lend £90m and £45m respectively through Kriya's platform.

In 2018 Kriya announced a partnership with Barclays bank to provide invoice finance to Barclays' business customers.

In 2021, Kriya completed a £280m debt and equity fundraise, and became accredited under the Recovery Loan Scheme (RLS) after being accredited in 2020 for the Coronavirus Business Interruption Loan Scheme (CBILS).

In 2022 Kriya raised £100m in debt financing from Deutsche Bank.

Awards 

Kriya has received several awards and commendations:
 Winners of 2019 Business Excellence Awards for Most Innovative Invoice Financing Solutions
	Winners of the 2019 Wealth & Finance magazine fintech award for Best SME Invoice Finance Solutions Provider
 Featured in 2017 and 2018 The Sunday Times Tech Track 100 ‘Ones to Watch’ list.
	Featured in the 2017 FinTechCity Fintech50 list and the 2018 Fintech50 Hall of Fame

References 

Financial services companies established in 2010
Financial services companies of the United Kingdom
Information technology companies of the United Kingdom
British companies established in 2010